Moira Stilwell (born 1953 or 1954) is a Canadian politician, who was elected as a member of the Legislative Assembly of British Columbia in 2009 to represent the riding of Vancouver-Langara until 2017. She was appointed parliamentary secretary for industry, research and innovation to the Minister of Jobs, Tourism and Innovation on March 14, 2011. She served as Minister of Advanced Education and Labour Market Development in the government of B.C. from June 2009 to October 2010 when she was appointed Minister of Regional Economic and Skills Development.

She resigned her cabinet post in November 2010 to stand for election as the leader of the British Columbia Liberal Party, but withdrew from the campaign on February 16, 2011. The election subsequently occurred on February 26, 2011 and was won by Christy Clark.

She was formerly the Minister of Social Development (2012).

Biography

Stilwell graduated from the University of Calgary Medical School, and received further training in nuclear medicine at the University of British Columbia and in radiology at the University of Toronto. She served for several years as the head of nuclear medicine at St. Paul's Hospital, Surrey Memorial Hospital, and Abbotsford Regional Hospital and Cancer Clinic, but left all those positions in 2009 to run for public office. Prior to that, she worked at BC Women's Hospital, where she served as co-medical director of the Breast Health Program as well as being the staff radiologist. Along with serving as a practicing physician and administrator, she was the clinical assistant professor in the Department of Radiology at the University of British Columbia.

In addition to her professional capacities, Stilwell also served as the co-chair of the Canadian Breast Cancer Foundation 2020 Task Force, and was past chair of the Canadian Breast Cancer Foundation/BC Yukon Chapter. She has also served on the board of the Canadian Breast Cancer Research Alliance and on the BC Women's Hospital Foundation Board.

She is currently practising at the BC Children’s Hospital and at St. Paul's Hospital where she is Head of the Division of Nuclear Medicine. She is active in resident teaching and encouraging physician engagement.

Campaign for the BC Liberal Party leadership
After entering the BC Liberal Party's 2011 leadership campaign, Stilwell focused her attention firmly on the importance of building a knowledge-based economy to ensure BC’s future prosperity; increasing the minimum wage in BC from $8/hour to $10/hour; and reducing the interest rate that students in BC pay for loans to finance their studies.

Stilwell dropped out of the campaign on February 16, 2011, announcing her support for George Abbott.

Action Plan for Repatriating B.C. Medical Students Studying Abroad and Conflict of Interests
In 2012, Moira wrote a letter and report titled "Action Plan for Repatriating B.C. Medical Students Studying Abroad" to Mike de Jong, the Minister of Health Services, on the subject of British Columbians who wanted to return to Canada for their medical residency. In her report, she admits "The Ministry of Health Services and the UBC Faculty of Medicine maintain that BC medical students studying abroad must be treated the same as immigrant physicians applying to the BC IMG program because to do otherwise would be a violation of human rights and the Canadian Charter of Rights" but Moira argued that Canadians Studying Abroad (CSAs) should be treated the same as Canadian and American trained medical school graduates i.e. preferentially treated over International Medical Graduates (IMGs). International Medical Graduates often have a very difficult time obtaining very limited residency positions in Canada.
 
As reported in Maclean's and The Tyee, Moira had an apparent and undisclosed personal stake and conflict of interest in this issue, as her son, Kevin Lichtenstein, was studying medicine at an international university, and thus would benefit from an easier residency process.

Allegations of Corruption in Son's Medical Residency Selection
On February 6, 2015, The Tyee reported that, "Cardiac surgeons on a selection committee at St. Paul's Hospital manipulated the hiring process for a training position so they could hire a student who was the son of their boss and of a provincial cabinet minister [Stilwell], documents show." During the selection process for residency, Dr. Cook at the University of British Columbia created an irregularity in the residency matching process where they left a spot open in during the first iteration of the matching process. Dr. Cook stated they had a candidate in mind who is a Canadian [who] studied medicine abroad and did an elective rotation with them. This candidate would not be eligible for 1st iteration but would be eligible for 2nd iteration. Dr. Wong, also with UBC, stated that the process followed was not "fair or transparent or equitable for the other CaRMS candidates," and further that "the Program's actions were not compliant with the CaRMS rules and procedures and that this irregularity could be contested to CaRMS in the future by a candidate and/or a medical school."

Ultimately, the Cardiac Surgery residency slot was opened for a 2nd iteration, a CaRMS irregularity. In that 2nd iteration, over 96 applicants applied, and her son was selected as the successful candidate. As he was an international medical graduate, he was not eligible to apply to the 1st iteration of the Cardiac Surgery program at UBC. However, because of the irregularity that occurred (which notably was not compliant with the CaRMS rules),he was able to apply and gain entrance into the program.

References

External links
 Moira Stilwell, MLA for Vancouver-Langara 
 Moira Stilwell, BC Liberal Party profile

Living people
British Columbia Liberal Party MLAs
Canadian hospital administrators
Women government ministers of Canada
Members of the Executive Council of British Columbia
Politicians from Vancouver
Canadian nuclear medicine physicians
University of Calgary alumni
Women MLAs in British Columbia
Year of birth missing (living people)
21st-century Canadian politicians
21st-century Canadian women politicians